Air Itam is a state constituency in Penang, Malaysia, that has been represented in the Penang State Legislative Assembly since 1959. It covers much of Air Itam, a western suburb of George Town.

The state constituency was first contested in 1959 and is mandated to return a single Assemblyman to the Penang State Legislative Assembly under the first-past-the-post voting system. , the State Assemblyman for Air Itam is Joseph Ng Soon Seong from the Democratic Action Party (DAP), which is part of the state's ruling coalition, Pakatan Harapan (PH).

Definition

Polling districts 
According to the federal gazette issued on 30 March 2018, the Air Itam constituency is divided into 9 polling districts.

This state seat comprises a large chunk of Air Itam, a suburb of George Town nestled in the central valleys of Penang Island. The 'old town', which contains the Air Itam Market and the Kek Lok Si Temple, is also situated within this constituency.

Air Itam Road forms the northern limits of the Air Itam constituency, with the portion of Air Itam north of the road falling under either Air Putih or Kebun Bunga constituencies. To the south, the Air Itam seat is partly bounded along the Dondang River; the portion of Air Itam south of the river, including Farlim, falls under the neighbouring Paya Terubong constituency. The Air Itam constituency also stretches up to Green Lane and Scotland Road to the east.

Demographics

History 
The Air Itam state constituency was originally named Ayer Itam when it was formed prior to the 1959 State Elections. The seat was then given its present name in time for the 1995 State Election.

Since its formation in 1959, the Air Itam seat has experienced one by-election. The 1965 Ayer Itam by-election marked the first time an opposition party captured the constituency, as Lim Kean Siew from the Labour Party became the State Assemblyman for Ayer Itam until the 1969 State Election.

Election results 
The electoral results for the Air Itam state constituency in 2008, 2013 and 2018 are as follows.

See also 
 Constituencies of Penang

References 

Penang state constituencies